The play-offs of the 2014 Fed Cup Europe/Africa Zone Group III were the final stages of the Group III zonal competition involving teams from Europe and Africa. Using the positions determined in their pools, the twelve teams faced off to determine their placing in the 2014 Fed Cup Europe/Africa Zone Group III. The top two teams advanced to Fed Cup Europe/Africa Zone Group II.

Promotional play-offs
The first placed teams of each pool were drawn in head-to-head rounds. The winner of each round advanced to Group II in 2014.

Estonia vs. Denmark

Greece vs. Ireland

5th to 8th play-offs
The second placed teams of each pool were drawn in head-to-head rounds to find the equal fifth and seventh placed teams.

Namibia vs. Norway

Moldova vs. Malta

9th to 12th play-offs
The third placed teams of each pool were drawn in head-to-head rounds to find the equal ninth and eleventh placed teams.

Armenia vs. Madagascar

Cyprus vs. Iceland

Final placements

  and  advanced to Europe/Africa Group II in 2015.

References

External links 
 Fed Cup website

P3